In geometry, the Poincaré disk model, also called the conformal disk model, is a model of 2-dimensional hyperbolic geometry in which all points are inside the unit disk, and straight lines are either circular arcs contained within the disk that are orthogonal to the unit circle or diameters of the unit circle.

The group of orientation preserving isometries of the disk model is given by the projective special unitary group , the quotient of the special unitary group SU(1,1) by its center .

Along with the Klein model and the Poincaré half-space model, it was proposed by Eugenio Beltrami who used these models to show that hyperbolic geometry was equiconsistent with Euclidean geometry. It is named after Henri Poincaré, because his rediscovery of this representation fourteen years later became better known than the original work of Beltrami.

The Poincaré ball model is the similar model for 3 or n-dimensional hyperbolic geometry in which the points of the geometry are in the n-dimensional unit ball.

History 
The Poincaré disk was described by Henri Poincaré in his 1882 treatment of hyperbolic, parabolic and elliptic functions, but became widely known following Poincaré's presentation in his 1905 philosophical treatise, Science and Hypothesis. There he describes a world, now known as the Poincaré disk, in which space was Euclidean, but which appeared to its inhabitants to satisfy the axioms of hyperbolic geometry:"Suppose, for example, a world enclosed in a large sphere and subject to the following laws: The temperature is not uniform; it is greatest at their centre, and gradually decreases as we move towards the circumference of the sphere, where it is absolute zero. Further, I shall suppose that in this world all bodies have the same co-efficient of dilatation, so that the linear dilatation of any body is proportional to its absolute temperature. Finally, I shall assume that a body transported from one point to another of different temperature is instantaneously in thermal equilibrium with its new environment. ...

If they construct a geometry, it will not be like ours, which is the study of the movements of our invariable solids; it will be the study of the changes of position which they will have thus distinguished, and will be 'non-Euclidean displacements,' and this will be non-Euclidean geometry. So that beings like ourselves, educated in such a world, will not have the same geometry as ours." (pp.65-68)Poincaré's disk was an important piece of evidence for the hypothesis that the choice of spatial geometry is conventional rather than factual, especially in the influential philosophical discussions of Rudolf Carnap and of Hans Reichenbach.

Properties

Lines

Hyperbolic straight lines consist of all arcs of Euclidean circles contained within the disk that are orthogonal to the boundary of the disk, plus all diameters of the disk.

Compass and straightedge construction 

The unique hyperbolic line through two points  and  not on a diameter of the boundary circle can be constructed by:
 let  be the inversion in the boundary circle of point 
 let  be the inversion in the boundary circle of point 
 let  be the midpoint of segment 
 let  be the midpoint of segment 
 Draw line  through  perpendicular to segment 
 Draw line  through  perpendicular to segment 
 let  be where line  and line  intersect.
 Draw circle  with center  and going through  (and ).
 The part of circle  that is inside the disk is the hyperbolic line.

If P and Q are on a diameter of the boundary circle that diameter is the hyperbolic line.

Another way is:

 let  be the midpoint of segment 
 Draw line m through  perpendicular to segment 
 let  be the inversion in the boundary circle of point 
 let  be the midpoint of segment 
 Draw line  through  perpendicular to segment 
 let  be where line  and line  intersect.
 Draw circle  with center  and going through  (and ).
 The part of circle  that is inside the disk is the hyperbolic line.

Distance 

Distances in this model are Cayley–Klein metrics.

The hyperbolic distance between p and q is then 

The vertical bars indicate Euclidean length of the line segment connecting the points between them in the model (not along the circle arc), ln is the natural logarithm.

Another way to calculate the hyperbolic distance between two points is 

When the disk used is the open unit disk and one of the points is the origin and the Euclidean distance between the points is r then the hyperbolic distance is: 
 where  is the inverse hyperbolic function of the hyperbolic tangent.

When the disk used is the open unit disk and point  lies between the origin and point  (i.e. the two points are on the same radius, have the same polar angle and ), their hyperbolic distance is 
This reduces to the previous formula if .

Circles 
A circle (the set of all points in a plane that are at a given distance from a given point, its center) is a circle completely inside the disk not touching or intersecting its boundary. The hyperbolic center of the circle in the model does not in general correspond to the Euclidean center of the circle, but they are on the same radius of the boundary circle.

Hypercycles 
A hypercycle (the set of all points in a plane that are on one side and at a given distance from a given line, its axis) is a Euclidean circle arc or chord of the boundary circle that intersects the boundary circle at a positive but non-right angle. Its axis is the hyperbolic line that shares the same two ideal points. This is also known as an equidistant curve.

Horocycles 
A horocycle (a curve whose normal or perpendicular geodesics all converge asymptotically in the same direction), is a circle inside the disk that touches the boundary circle of the disk. The point where it touches the boundary circle is not part of the horocycle. It is an ideal point and is the  hyperbolic center of the horocycle.

Euclidean synopsis

A Euclidean circle:
 that is completely inside the disk is a hyperbolic circle. 

(When the center of the disk is not inside the circle, the Euclidean center is always closer to the center of the disk than what the hyperbolic center is, i.e.  holds.)

 that is inside the disk and touches the boundary is a horocycle;
 that intersects the boundary orthogonally is a hyperbolic line; and
 that intersects the boundary non-orthogonally is a hypercycle.

A Euclidean chord of the boundary circle:
 that goes through the center is a hyperbolic line; and
 that does not go through the center is a hypercycle.

Metric and curvature

If u and v are two vectors in real n-dimensional vector space Rn with the usual Euclidean norm, both of which have norm less than 1, then we may define an isometric invariant by

where  denotes the usual Euclidean norm. Then the distance function is

Such a distance function is defined for any two vectors of norm less than one, and makes the set of such vectors into a metric space which is a model of hyperbolic space of constant curvature −1. The model has the conformal property that the angle between two intersecting curves in hyperbolic space is the same as the angle in the model.

The associated metric tensor of the Poincaré disk model is given by

where the xi are the Cartesian coordinates of the ambient Euclidean space. The geodesics of the disk model are circles perpendicular to the boundary sphere Sn−1.

An orthonormal frame with respect to this Riemannian metric is given by

with dual coframe of 1-forms

In two dimensions

In two dimensions, with respect to these frames and the Levi-Civita connection, the connection forms are given by the unique skew-symmetric matrix of 1-forms  that is torsion-free, i.e., that satisfies the matrix equation . Solving this equation for  yields

where the curvature matrix is

Therefore, the curvature of the hyperbolic disk is

Relation to other models of hyperbolic geometry

Relation to the Klein disk model 

The Klein disk model (also known as the Beltrami–Klein model)  and the Poincaré disk model are both models that project the whole hyperbolic plane in a disk. 
The two models are related through a projection on or from the hemisphere model. The Klein disk model is an orthographic projection to the hemisphere model while the Poincaré disk model is a stereographic projection.

An advantage of the Klein disk model is that lines in this model are Euclidean straight chords. A disadvantage is that the Klein disk model is not conformal (circles and angles are distorted).

When projecting the same lines in both models on one disk both lines go through the same two ideal points. (the ideal points remain on the same spot) also the pole of the chord in the Klein disk model is the center of the circle that contains the arc in the Poincaré disk model.

For ideal points  and the formulas become  so the points are fixed.

If  is a vector of norm less than one representing a point of the Poincaré disk model, then the corresponding point of the  Klein disk model is given by:

Conversely, from a vector  of norm less than one representing a point of the Beltrami–Klein model, the corresponding point of the Poincaré disk model is given by:

Relation to the Poincaré half-plane model

The Poincaré disk model and the Poincaré half-plane model are both named after Henri Poincaré.

If  is a complex number of norm less than one representing a point of the Poincaré disk model, then the corresponding point of the half-plane model is given by the inverse of the Cayley transform:

Relation to the hyperboloid model

The Poincaré disk model, as well as the Klein model, are related to the hyperboloid model projectively. If we have a point [t, x1, ..., xn] on the upper sheet of the hyperboloid of the hyperboloid model, thereby defining a point in the hyperboloid model, we may project it onto the hyperplane t = 0 by intersecting it with a line drawn through [−1, 0, ..., 0]. The result is the corresponding point of the Poincaré disk model.

For Cartesian coordinates (t, xi) on the hyperboloid and (yi) on the plane, the conversion formulas are:

Compare the formulas for stereographic projection between a sphere and a plane.

Analytic geometry constructions in the hyperbolic plane

A basic construction of analytic geometry is to find a line through two given points. In the Poincaré disk model, lines in the plane are defined by portions of circles having equations of the form

which is the general form of a circle orthogonal to the unit circle, or else by diameters. Given two points u = (u1,u2) and v = (v1,v2) in the disk which do not lie on a diameter, we can solve for the circle of this form passing through both points, and obtain

If the points u and v are points on the boundary of the disk not lying at the endpoints of a diameter, the above simplifies to

Angles

We may compute the angle between the circular arc whose endpoints (ideal points) are given by unit vectors u and v, and the arc whose endpoints are s and t, by means of a formula. Since the ideal points are the same in the Klein model and the Poincaré disk model, the formulas are identical for each model.

If both models' lines are diameters, so that v = −u and t = −s, then we are merely finding the angle between two unit vectors, and the formula for the angle θ is

If v = −u but not t = −s, the formula becomes, in terms of the wedge product,

where

If both chords are not diameters, the general formula obtains

where

Using the Binet–Cauchy identity and the fact that these are unit vectors we may rewrite the above expressions purely in terms of the dot product, as

Artistic realizations

M. C. Escher explored the concept of representing infinity on a two-dimensional plane. Discussions with Canadian mathematician H.S.M. Coxeter around 1956 inspired Escher's interest in hyperbolic tessellations, which are regular tilings of the hyperbolic plane. Escher's wood engravings Circle Limit I–IV demonstrate this concept between 1958 and 1960, the final one being Circle Limit IV: Heaven and Hell in 1960.  According to Bruno Ernst, the best of them is Circle Limit III.

See also
 Hyperbolic geometry
 Beltrami–Klein model
 Poincaré half-plane model
 Poincaré metric
 Pseudosphere
 Hyperboloid model
 Inversive geometry
 Uniform tilings in hyperbolic plane

References

Further reading
 James W. Anderson, Hyperbolic Geometry, second edition, Springer, 2005.
 Eugenio Beltrami, Teoria fondamentale degli spazii di curvatura costante, Annali. di Mat., ser II 2 (1868), 232–255.
 Saul Stahl, The Poincaré Half-Plane, Jones and Bartlett, 1993.

External links
 

Multi-dimensional geometry
Hyperbolic geometry
Disk